Chi Lăng is the name of several places in Vietnam. The name was derived from Chi Lăng pass in current-day Lạng Sơn Province, which was the site of many battles between feudal Vietnam and northern armies.

 Chi Lăng District, a rural district of Lạng Sơn Province
 , a ward of Pleiku
 , a ward of Lạng Sơn City
 Chi Lăng, An Giang, a township of Tịnh Biên District
 , a township of Chi Lăng District
 , a rural commune of Quế Võ District
 , a rural commune of Chi Lăng District
 , a rural commune of Tràng Định District, Lạng Sơn Province
 , a rural commune of Hưng Hà District

Other uses
 Chi Lăng Stadium, a multi-purpose stadium in Đà Nẵng